Michal Ščasný (born 19 August 1978) is a Czech football manager of Dukla Banská Bystrica and former player.

Personal life
He is the son of Zdeněk Ščasný and the brother of Pavlína Ščasná.

Honours

Manager
Spartak Trnava
 Slovnaft Cup: 2018–19

References

External links

1978 births
Living people
Czech footballers
Czech expatriate footballers
Czech football managers
Association football defenders
Expatriate footballers in Slovakia
Czech expatriate sportspeople in Slovakia
Expatriate footballers in Belgium
Czech expatriate sportspeople in Belgium
Expatriate footballers in Cyprus
Czech expatriate sportspeople in Cyprus
AC Sparta Prague players
FK Viktoria Žižkov players
1. FC Tatran Prešov players
K.V.C. Westerlo players
Anagennisi Deryneia FC players
APEP FC players
Czech First League players
Slovak Super Liga players
Belgian Pro League players
Cypriot Second Division players
FK Senica managers
FC Spartak Trnava managers
FC Nitra managers
FK Dukla Banská Bystrica managers
Slovak Super Liga managers
Expatriate football managers in Slovakia
FK Ústí nad Labem players
Czech National Football League players